The Devil's Rejects is the soundtrack for Rob Zombie's film The Devil's Rejects. It was released as a standard CD and as a DualDisc. While both feature the same songs, the DualDisc also includes sound clips from the film, as well as including the album in high-resolution stereo, a behind-the-scenes documentary about the film and a photogallery on the DVD side.

Track listing
Note that all sound clips are only included on the DualDisc, not the CD
 Sound clip: "You Ain't Getting Me"  – 0:18
 "Midnight Rider" – Allman Brothers Band – 2:55
 Sound clip: "I Call 'Em Like I See 'Em" – 0:26
 "Shambala" – Three Dog Night – 3:20
 Sound clip: "Find a New Angle" – 0:19
 "Brave Awakening" – Terry Reid – 6:19
 Sound clip: "It's Just So Depressing" – 0:35
 "It Wasn't God Who Made Honky Tonk Angels" – Kitty Wells – 2:27
 Sound clip: "Would You Say That Again" – 0:21
 "Satan's Got to Get Along Without Me" – Buck Owens & His Buckaroos – 1:59
 Sound clip: "This Is Insane" – 0:10
 "Fooled Around and Fell in Love" – Elvin Bishop – 4:34
 Sound clip: "Chinese, Japanese" – 0:19
 "I Can't Quit You Baby" – Otis Rush – 3:04
 Sound clip: "Top Secret Clown Business" – 0:19
 "Funk #49" – James Gang – 3:52
 Sound clip: "Have Fun Scrapping Them Brains" – 0:07
 "Rock On" – David Essex – 3:24
 Sound clip: "Tutti Fruity" – 0:25
 "Rocky Mountain Way" – Joe Walsh – 5:15
 Sound clip: "What'd You Call Me?" – 0:11
 "To Be Treated Rite" – Terry Reid – 5:51
 Sound clip: "You Have Got It Made" – 0:17
 "Free Bird" – Lynyrd Skynyrd – 9:05
 Sound clip: "We've Always Been Devil Slayers" – 0:35
 "Seed of Memory" – Terry Reid – 5:19
 Sound clip: "Banjo & Sullivan Radio Spot #1" – 0:09
 "I'm At Home Getting Hammered (While She's Out Getting Nailed)" – Banjo & Sullivan – 2:40
 Sound clip: "Banjo & Sullivan Radio Spot #2" – 0:06

Chart positions
Album – Billboard (North America)

See also
 Rob Zombie discography

References

Albums produced by Rob Zombie
Horror film soundtracks
2005 soundtrack albums
Hip-O Records soundtracks
Rock soundtracks
Tyler Bates soundtracks
Firefly (film series)